Mahalasville is an unincorporated community on the border of Jackson Township and Washington Township in Morgan County, Indiana.

History
A post office was established at Mahalasville in 1854, and remained in operation until it was discontinued in 1928.

Geography

References

Unincorporated communities in Morgan County, Indiana
Unincorporated communities in Indiana
Indianapolis metropolitan area